Barbara Jean McNair
(March 4, 1934 – February 4, 2007) was an American singer and theater, television, and film actress. McNair's career spanned over five decades in television, film, and stage. McNair's professional career began in music during the late 1950s, singing in the nightclub circuit. In 1958, McNair released her debut single "Till There Was You" from Coral Records which was a commercial success. McNair performed all across the world, touring with Nat King Cole and later appearing in his Broadway stage shows I'm with You and The Merry World of Nat King Cole in the early 1960s.

By the 1970s, McNair gradually changed over to acting in films and television; she played Sidney Poitier's wife in They Call Me Mister Tibbs! (1970) and its sequel, The Organization (1971). In her later years, McNair returned to performing in nightclubs and on cruise ships. McNair died from throat cancer on February 4, 2007, at age 72.

Biography

Early life and education
Born in Chicago, Illinois, to Horace McNair and Claudia McNair (née Taylor), McNair moved with her family, which also consisted of four siblings, to Racine, Wisconsin, shortly after her birth. With her parents' persuasion, McNair began singing in school productions and during church services. McNair attended Washington Park High School, graduating in 1952.

After high school, McNair studied music at the American Conservatory of Music in Chicago. She also briefly attended UCLA because she had been raised to believe that whatever people planned to do with their lives they had to go to college to learn how to do it. She dropped college after one year when she felt it had nothing to do with what she wanted to accomplish.

Career

McNair's big break came with a win on Arthur Godfrey's Talent Scouts, which led to bookings at The Purple Onion and the Cocoanut Grove. Described by the New York Times as "a gorgeous looking woman with a warm, easy, communicative personality and a voice that can range from softly intense ballads to the edges of gospel", Barbara soon became a popular headliner and a guest on such television variety shows as The Steve Allen Show, Hullabaloo, The Bell Telephone Hour, and The Hollywood Palace. Among her hit records while recording for the Coral, Signature, Motown, and TEC Recording Studios labels, were "You're Gonna Love My Baby" and "Bobby".

In the early 1960s, McNair made several musical shorts for Scopitone, a franchise of coin-operated machines that showed what were the forerunners of today's music videos. In 1967 McNair travelled with Bob Hope to Southeast Asia to perform for U.S. troops during the Vietnam War. McNair's acting career began on television, as a guest on series such as Dr. Kildare, The Eleventh Hour, I Spy, Mission: Impossible, Hogan's Heroes, and McMillan and Wife. McNair posed nude for Playboy in the October 1968 issue. She caught the attention of the movie-going public with her much-publicized nude sequences in the gritty crime drama If He Hollers, Let Him Go! (1968) opposite Raymond St. Jacques. She then donned a nun's habit alongside Mary Tyler Moore for Change of Habit (1969), Elvis Presley's last feature film. She portrayed Sidney Poitier's wife in They Call Me Mister Tibbs! (1970) and its sequel, The Organization (1971), and George Jefferson's deranged ex-girlfriend Yvonne in The Jeffersons (1984).

McNair's Broadway credits include The Body Beautiful (1958), No Strings (1962, replacing Diahann Carroll), and a revival of The Pajama Game (1973, co-starring with Hal Linden and Cab Calloway). McNair starred in her own 1969 television variety series The Barbara McNair Show, becoming one of the first black women to host her own musical variety show. The show, which was produced in Canada by CTV (at CFTO, Toronto), lasted three seasons in first-run syndication in the United States until 1972. The show starred A-list guests including Tony Bennett, Sonny and Cher, Little Richard, The Righteous Brothers, Johnny Mathis, Freda Payne, Mahalia Jackson, Della Reese, Lou Rawls, Rich Little, B.B. King, Ethel Waters, Debbie Reynolds, Lionel Hampton, and The Irish Rovers.

McNair was a headliner at Las Vegas hotels like the Sahara. She also appeared on TV game shows in the 1960s and 70s, including You Don't Say, Hollywood Squares, and The Match Game. She was also a VIP guest on the talk shows of Johnny Carson, Joey Bishop, Mike Douglas, and Merv Griffin. McNair's recordings include Livin' End, The Real Barbara McNair, More Today Than Yesterday, Broadway Show Stoppers, A Movie Soundtrack If He Hollers, Let Him Go, I Enjoy Being a Girl, and The Ultimate Motown Collection, a two-CD set with 48 tracks that include her two albums for the label plus a non-album single and B-side and an entire LP that never was released. In the late 1970s McNair was one of the original members of the "Four Girls Four" act, along with Rose Marie, Rosemary Clooney, and Margaret Whiting. She was quickly replaced by Helen O'Connell, however, as she was deemed too young to fit in with the rest of the group.

Personal life
McNair was married five times and had no children. McNair's first husband was Earl Wright whom she was married to from 1953 until 1955. From 1963 until 1971, McNair was married to Jack Rafferty. In August 1972, she married Rick Manzie, whom she had met in 1965 during a separation period from Rafferty (McNair remained married to Rafferty as he helped co-produce The Barbara McNair Show along with Rick Manzie who lived with Barbara in their Las Vegas home at 4265 South Bruce Street). McNair and Manzie remained married until his murder in December 1976. Three years after Manzie's death, McNair married Ben Strahan in 1979. McNair and Strahan divorced in 1986. Her last marriage was to Charles Blecka in 2006, to whom she was married at the time of her death. McNair is the cousin of musician Curtis Knight.

1972 arrest and Manzie
In October 1972, McNair was arrested for possession of heroin at the Playboy Club in New Jersey. The charges stemmed from McNair signing for a package containing drugs that was delivered to her home. McNair stated she had no knowledge of the contents of the package or who sent it. McNair's then-husband Rick Manzie was later charged with the crime and charges against McNair were dropped in April 1973.

On December 15, 1976, McNair's third husband, Chicago businessman Rick Manzie, was murdered in their Las Vegas mansion. Mafia boss-turned-FBI-informant Jimmy Fratianno later claimed in his book The Last Mafioso that Manzie had been a Mafia associate who tried to put a contract on the life of a mob-associated tax attorney with whom he had a legal dispute.

Bankruptcy, later years, and death
McNair filed for bankruptcy in September 1987, with debt totaling $458,399 ($ million today). Into her 70s, McNair resided in the Los Angeles area, playing tennis and skiing to keep in shape and touring on occasion. McNair died on February 4, 2007, after a seven-year battle with throat cancer, in Los Angeles, California.

Filmography
Spencer's Mountain (1963) – Graduation Singer (uncredited)
If He Hollers, Let Him Go! (1968) – Lily
Stiletto (1969) – Ahn Dessie
Venus in Furs (1969) – Rita
The Lonely Profession (1969) – Donna Travers
Change of Habit (1969) – Sister Irene
They Call Me Mister Tibbs! (1970) – Valerie Tibbs
The Organization (1971) – Valerie Tibbs
McMillan & Wife  (1974) Lee Richards 
Fatal Charm (1990 film)  – English Teacher
Neon Signs (1996) – Grace (final film role)

Discography

Albums 
 Front Row Center (Coral CRL57209, 1959)
 Love Talk (Signature SM 1042, 1960)
 The Livin' End (Warner WS 1570, 1964)
 I Enjoy Being A Girl (Warner WS 1541, 1966)
 Here I Am (Motown MS-644, November 1966)
 The Real Barbara McNair (Motown MS-680, April 1969)
 More Today Than Yesterday (Audio Fidelity – AFSD 6222, 1969)
 Here's To Life (2006)

References

External links

 The Official Barbara McNair website created by her nephew John Thomas
 
 
 

1934 births
2007 deaths
20th-century American actresses
20th-century American women singers
20th-century American singers
African-American actresses
African-American female models
20th-century African-American women singers
African-American television talk show hosts
American television talk show hosts
American film actresses
American musical theatre actresses
American television actresses
Coral Records artists
Deaths from cancer in California
Deaths from esophageal cancer
Female models from Illinois
Motown artists
Musicians from Racine, Wisconsin
Northern soul musicians
Singers from Chicago
21st-century African-American people
21st-century African-American women
United Service Organizations entertainers